The International Plant Protection Convention (IPPC) is a 1951 multilateral treaty overseen by the United Nations Food and Agriculture Organization that aims to secure coordinated, effective action to prevent and to control the introduction and spread of pests of plants and plant products. The Convention extends beyond the protection of cultivated plants to the protection of natural flora and plant products. It also takes into consideration both direct and indirect damage by pests, so it includes weeds.

The Convention created a governing body consisting of each party, known as the Commission on Phytosanitary Measures, which oversees the implementation of the convention (see ). As of August 2017, the convention has 183 parties, being 180 United Nations member states and the Cook Islands, Niue, and the European Union. The convention is recognized by the World Trade Organization's (WTO) Agreement on the Application of Sanitary and Phytosanitary Measures (the SPS Agreement) as the only international standard setting body for plant health.

Goals 
While the IPPC's primary focus is on plants and plant products moving in international trade, the convention also covers research materials, biological control organisms, germplasm banks, containment facilities, food aid, emergency aid and anything else that can act as a vector for the spread of plant pests – for example, containers, packaging materials, soil, vehicles, vessels and machinery.

The IPPC was created by member countries of the Food and Agriculture Organization (UN FAO). The IPPC places emphasis on three core areas: international standard setting, information exchange and capacity development for the implementation of the IPPC and associated international phytosanitary standards.  The Secretariat of the IPPC is housed at FAO headquarters in Rome, Italy, and is responsible for the coordination of core activities under the IPPC work program.

In recent years the Commission of Phytosanitary Measures of the IPPC has developed a strategic framework with the objectives of:
 protecting sustainable agriculture and enhancing global food security through the prevention of pest spread;
 protecting the environment, forests and biodiversity from plant pests;
 facilitating economic and trade development through the promotion of harmonized scientifically based phytosanitary measures, and:
 developing phytosanitary capacity for members to accomplish the preceding three objectives.

By focusing the convention's efforts on these objectives, the Commission on Phytosanitary Measures of the IPPC intends to:
 protect farmers from economically devastating pest and disease outbreaks.
 protect the environment from the loss of species diversity.
 protect ecosystems from the loss of viability and function as a result of pest invasions.
 protect industries and consumers from the costs of pest control or eradication.
 facilitate trade through International Standards that regulate the safe movements of plants and plant products.
 protect livelihoods and food security by preventing the entry and spread of new pests of plants into a country.

Regional Plant Protection Organizations 
Under the IPPC are Regional Plant Protection Organizations (RPPO). These are intergovernmental organizations responsible for cooperation in plant protection.
 Asia and Pacific Plant Protection Commission (APPPC)
 Caribbean Agricultural Health and Food Safety Agency (CAHFSA)
 Andean Community (Comunidad Andina, CAN)
 Plant Health Committee of the Southern Cone (COSAVE)
 European and Mediterranean Plant Protection Organization (EPPO)
 Inter-African Phytosanitary Council (IAPSC)
 Near East Plant Protection Organization (NEPPO)
 North American Plant Protection Organization (NAPPO)
 International Regional Organization for Agricultural Health (OIRSA)
 Pacific Plant Protection Organization (PPPO)

Under the IPPC, the role of an RPPO is to:
function as the coordinating bodies in the areas covered, shall participate in various activities to achieve the objectives of this Convention and, where appropriate, shall gather and disseminate information.
cooperate with the Secretary in achieving the objectives of the Convention and, where appropriate, cooperate with the Secretary and the Commission in developing international standards.
hold regular Technical Consultations of representatives of regional plant protection organizations to:
promote the development and use of relevant international standards for phytosanitary measures; and
encourage inter-regional cooperation in promoting harmonized phytosanitary measures for controlling pests and in preventing their spread and/or introduction.

International Plant Health Conference 
The first annual International Plant Health Conference was organized by the FAO and set to be hosted by the Finnish Government in Helsinki 28 June–July 1, 2021. However, on 9 February 2021 it was cancelled due to the ongoing pandemic.

Commission on Phytosanitary Measures 
The fifteenth session of the Commission on Phytosanitary Measures (CPM) was held 16 March, 18 March and 1 April 2021 virtually over Zoom.

ePhyto 
The IPPC created and administers the ePhyto system, the international electronic phytosanitary certificate standard. ePhyto has been very widely adopted   three million ePhyto certificates have been exchanged between exporting and importing partner states.

See also 
 Phytosanitary certification
 Phytosanitary Certificate Issuance and Tracking System (PCIT)
 International Year of Plant Health (IYPH)

References

External links 
 International Plant Protection Convention
 Food and Agriculture Organization of the United Nations
 Ratifications
 

1951 in the environment
Crop protection organizations
Treaties concluded in 1951
Treaties entered into force in 1952
International Plant Protection Convention
Treaties of Afghanistan
Treaties of Albania
Treaties of Algeria
Treaties of Antigua and Barbuda
Treaties of Argentina
Treaties of Armenia
Treaties of Australia
Treaties of Austria
Treaties of Azerbaijan
Treaties of the Bahamas
Treaties of Bahrain
Treaties of Bangladesh
Treaties of Barbados
Treaties of Belarus
Treaties of Belgium
Treaties of Belize
Treaties of Benin
Treaties of Bhutan
Treaties of Bolivia
Treaties of Bosnia and Herzegovina
Treaties of Botswana
Treaties of the Second Brazilian Republic
Treaties of Bulgaria
Treaties of Burkina Faso
Treaties of Burundi
Treaties of the French protectorate of Cambodia
Treaties of Cameroon
Treaties of Canada
Treaties of Cape Verde
Treaties of the Central African Republic
Treaties of Chad
Treaties of Chile
Treaties of the People's Republic of China
Treaties of Colombia
Treaties of the Cook Islands
Treaties of the Comoros
Treaties of the Democratic Republic of the Congo
Treaties of the Republic of the Congo
Treaties of Costa Rica
Treaties of Ivory Coast
Treaties of Croatia
Treaties of Cuba
Treaties of Cyprus
Treaties of the Czech Republic
Treaties of North Korea
Treaties of Denmark
Treaties of Djibouti
Treaties of Dominica
Treaties of the Dominican Republic
Treaties of Ecuador
Treaties of the Republic of Egypt (1953–1958)
Treaties of El Salvador
Treaties of Equatorial Guinea
Treaties of Eritrea
Treaties of Estonia
Treaties of the Derg
Treaties of Fiji
Treaties of Finland
Treaties of France
Treaties of Gabon
Treaties of the Gambia
Treaties of Georgia (country)
Treaties of Germany
Treaties of Ghana
Treaties of Greece
Treaties of Grenada
Treaties of Guatemala
Treaties of Guinea
Treaties of Guinea-Bissau
Treaties of Guyana
Treaties of Haiti
Treaties of Honduras
Treaties of Hungary
Treaties of Iceland
Treaties of India
Treaties of Indonesia
Treaties of Iran
Treaties of Ireland
Treaties of Israel
Treaties of Italy
Treaties of Jamaica
Treaties of Japan
Treaties of Jordan
Treaties of Kazakhstan
Treaties of Kenya
Treaties of the Kingdom of Afghanistan
Treaties of the Kingdom of Iraq
Treaties of the Kingdom of Laos
Treaties of Kuwait
Treaties of Kyrgyzstan
Treaties of Latvia
Treaties of Lebanon
Treaties of Lesotho
Treaties of Liberia
Treaties of the Libyan Arab Republic
Treaties of Lithuania
Treaties of Luxembourg
Treaties of Madagascar
Treaties of Malawi
Treaties of Malaysia
Treaties of the Maldives
Treaties of Mali
Treaties of Malta
Treaties of Mauritania
Treaties of Mauritius
Treaties of Mexico
Treaties of the Federated States of Micronesia
Treaties of Mongolia
Treaties of Montenegro
Treaties of Morocco
Treaties of Mozambique
Treaties of Myanmar
Treaties of Namibia
Treaties of Nepal
Treaties of the Netherlands
Treaties of New Zealand
Treaties of Nicaragua
Treaties of Niue
Treaties of Niger
Treaties of Nigeria
Treaties of Norway
Treaties of Oman
Treaties of the Dominion of Pakistan
Treaties of Palau
Treaties of Panama
Treaties of Papua New Guinea
Treaties of Paraguay
Treaties of Peru
Treaties of the Philippines
Treaties of Poland
Treaties of Portugal
Treaties of Qatar
Treaties of South Korea
Treaties of Moldova
Treaties of Romania
Treaties of Russia
Treaties of Rwanda
Treaties of Samoa
Treaties of São Tomé and Príncipe
Treaties of Saudi Arabia
Treaties of Senegal
Treaties of Serbia
Treaties of Seychelles
Treaties of Sierra Leone
Treaties of Singapore
Treaties of Slovakia
Treaties of Slovenia
Treaties of the Solomon Islands
Treaties of South Africa
Treaties of South Sudan
Treaties of Spain
Treaties of the Dominion of Ceylon
Treaties of Saint Kitts and Nevis
Treaties of Saint Lucia
Treaties of Saint Vincent and the Grenadines
Treaties of the Democratic Republic of the Sudan
Treaties of Suriname
Treaties of Eswatini
Treaties of Sweden
Treaties of Switzerland
Treaties of Syria
Treaties of Tajikistan
Treaties of Thailand
Treaties of North Macedonia
Treaties of Togo
Treaties of Tonga
Treaties of Trinidad and Tobago
Treaties of Tunisia
Treaties of Turkey
Treaties of Tuvalu
Treaties of Uganda
Treaties of Ukraine
Treaties of the United Arab Emirates
Treaties of the United Kingdom
Treaties of Tanzania
Treaties of the United States
Treaties of Uruguay
Treaties of Uzbekistan
Treaties of Vanuatu
Treaties of Venezuela
Treaties of Vietnam
Treaties of Yemen
Treaties of Zambia
Treaties of Zimbabwe
Treaties entered into by the European Union
International Plant Protection Convention
International Plant Protection Convention
1951 in Italy
Treaties establishing intergovernmental organizations
Agricultural treaties
Treaties extended to Norfolk Island
Treaties extended to the Isle of Man
Treaties extended to Jersey
Treaties extended to Guernsey
Treaties extended to American Samoa
Treaties extended to Baker Island
Treaties extended to Guam
Treaties extended to Howland Island
Treaties extended to Jarvis Island
Treaties extended to Johnston Atoll
Treaties extended to Midway Atoll
Treaties extended to Navassa Island
Treaties extended to the Trust Territory of the Pacific Islands
Treaties extended to Palmyra Atoll
Treaties extended to Puerto Rico
Treaties extended to the United States Virgin Islands
Treaties extended to Wake Island
Treaties extended to the Nauru Trust Territory
Treaties extended to Netherlands New Guinea
Treaties extended to Surinam (Dutch colony)
Treaties extended to Macau
Treaties extended to the Panama Canal Zone